The Vienna State Opera is an opera house and opera company based in Vienna, Austria. The 1,709-seat Renaissance Revival venue was the first major building on the Vienna Ring Road. It was built from 1861 to 1869 following plans by August Sicard von Sicardsburg and Eduard van der Nüll, and designs by Josef Hlávka. The opera house was inaugurated as the "Vienna Court Opera" (Wiener Hofoper) in the presence of Emperor Franz Joseph I and Empress Elisabeth of Austria. It became known by its current name after the establishment of the First Austrian Republic in 1921. The Vienna State Opera is the successor of the old Vienna Court Opera (built in 1636 inside the Hofburg). The new site was chosen and the construction paid by Emperor Franz Joseph in 1861.

The members of the Vienna Philharmonic are recruited from the Vienna State Opera's orchestra. The building is also the home of the Vienna State Ballet, and it hosts the annual Vienna Opera Ball during the carnival season.

History

History of the building

Construction
The opera house was the first major building on the Vienna Ringstrasse commissioned by the Viennese "city expansion fund". Work commenced on the house in 1861 and was completed in 1869, following plans drawn up by architects August Sicard von Sicardsburg and Eduard van der Nüll. It was built in the Neo-Renaissance style by the renowned Czech architect and contractor Josef Hlávka.

The Ministry of the Interior had commissioned a number of reports into the availability of certain building materials, with the result that stones long not seen in Vienna were used, such as Wöllersdorfer Stein, for plinths and free-standing, simply-divided buttresses, the famously hard stone from Kaisersteinbruch, whose colour was more appropriate than that of Kelheimerstein, for more lushly decorated parts. The somewhat coarser-grained Kelheimerstein (also known as Solnhof Plattenstein) was intended as the main stone to be used in the building of the opera house, but the necessary quantity was not deliverable. Breitenbrunner stone was suggested as a substitute for the Kelheimer stone, and stone from Jois was used as a cheaper alternative to the Kaiserstein. The staircases were constructed from polished Kaiserstein, while most of the rest of the interior was decorated with varieties of marble.

The decision was made to use dimension stone for the exterior of the building. Due to the monumental demand for stone, stone from Sóskút, widely used in Budapest, was also used. Three Viennese masonry companies were employed to supply enough masonry labour: Eduard Hauser (still in existence today), Anton Wasserburger and Moritz Pranter. The foundation stone was laid on 20 May 1863.

Public response
The building was, however, not very popular with the public. On the one hand, it did not seem as grand as the Heinrichshof, a private residence which was destroyed in World War II (and replaced in 1955 by the Opernringhof). Moreover, because the level of Ringstraße was raised by a metre in front of the opera house after its construction had begun, the latter was likened to "a sunken treasure chest" and, in analogy to the military disaster of 1866 (the Battle of Königgrätz), was deprecatingly referred to as "the 'Königgrätz' of architecture". Eduard van der Nüll committed suicide, and barely ten weeks later Sicardsburg died from tuberculosis so neither architect saw the completion of the building. The opening premiere was Don Giovanni, by Mozart, on 25 May 1869. Emperor Franz Josef and Empress Elisabeth (Sissi) were present.

WW II bombing and redesign

Towards the end of World War II, on 12 March 1945, the opera was set alight by an American bombardment. The auditorium and stage were destroyed by flames, as well as almost the entire décor and props for more than 120 operas with around 150,000 costumes. The front section, which had been walled off as a precaution, however, remained intact including the foyer, with frescoes by Moritz von Schwind, the main stairways, the vestibule and the tea room.  The State Opera was temporarily housed at the Theater an der Wien and at the Vienna Volksoper.

Lengthy discussion took place about whether the opera house should be restored to its original state on its original site, or whether it should be completely demolished and rebuilt, either on the same location or on a different site. Eventually the decision was made to rebuild the opera house as it had been, and the main restoration experts involved were Ernst Kolb (1948–1952) and Udo Illig (1953–1956).

The Austrian Federal Chancellor Leopold Figl made the decision in 1946 to have a functioning opera house again by 1949. An architectural competition was announced, which was won by Erich Boltenstern. The submissions had ranged from a complete restructuring of the auditorium to a replica of the original design; Boltenstern decided on a design similar to the original with some modernisation in keeping with the design of the 1950s. In order to achieve a good acoustic, wood was the favoured building material, at the advice of, among others, Arturo Toscanini. In addition, the number of seats in the parterre (stalls) was reduced, and the fourth gallery, which had been fitted with columns, was restructured so as not to need columns. The façade, entrance hall and the "Schwind" foyer were restored and remain in their original style.

In the meantime, the opera company, which had at first been performing in the Volksoper, had moved rehearsals and performances to Theater an der Wien, where, on 1 May 1945, after the liberation and re-independence of Austria from the Nazis, the first performances were given. In 1947, the company went on tour to London.

Due to the appalling conditions at Theater an der Wien, the opera company leadership tried to raise significant quantities of money to speed up reconstruction of the original opera house. Many private donations were made, as well as donations of building material from the Soviets, who were very interested in the rebuilding of the opera. The mayor of Vienna had receptacles placed in many sites around Vienna for people to donate coins only. In this way, everyone in Vienna could say they had participated in the reconstruction and feel pride in considering themselves part owners.

However, in 1949, there was only a temporary roof on the Staatsoper, as construction work continued. It was not until 5 November 1955, after the Austrian State Treaty, that the Staatsoper could be reopened with a performance of Beethoven's Fidelio, conducted by Karl Böhm. The American Secretary of State, John Foster Dulles, was present. The state broadcaster ORF used the occasion to make its first live broadcast, at a time when there were only c. 800 televiewers in the whole of Austria. The new auditorium had a reduced capacity of about 2,276, including 567 standing room places. The ensemble, which had remained unified until the opening, crumbled in the following years, and slowly an international ensemble formed.

History of the company post-WW II
In 1945, the Wiener Mozart-Ensemble was formed, which put on world-renowned guest performances and became known particularly for its singing and playing culture. The Austrian conductor Josef Krips was the founder and mentor, who had only survived the Nazi era (given his Jewish heritage) thanks to luck and help from colleagues. At the end of the war, Krips started the renovation of the Staatoper, and was able to implement his aesthetic principles, including the departure from the Romantic Mozart ideal with a voluminous orchestral sound. Instead, qualities more associated with chamber music were featured, as well as a clearer, lighter sound, which would later come to be known as "typically Viennese". Singers who worked with Krips during this time were Erich Kunz, Elisabeth Schwarzkopf and Wilma Lipp, among others.

As early as 1947, the Mozart-Ensemble was playing guest performances at the Royal Opera House in London, with Mozart's Don Giovanni. Richard Tauber, who had fled from the Nazis, sang Don Ottavio; three months later he died, and was remembered for singing with "half a lung" in order to fulfil his dream, many other artists became associated with the Mozart-Ensemble, for example Karl Böhm, but their role was still greatly peripheral, in a straightforward or assisting role. This was the beginning of Krips' worldwide career, which would take him to the most prominent houses in the world. Until his death in 1974, Krips was regarded as one of the most important Maestri (conductors/music directors) of the Staatsoper.

On 1 July 1998, a historical broadcast took place, as Austria undertook its first presidency of the European Union. Fidelio was broadcast live from the Vienna State Opera to the 15 capital cities of the EU.

Today

The company 
The Vienna State Opera is closely linked to the Vienna Philharmonic, which is an incorporated society of its own, but whose members are recruited from the orchestra of the Vienna State Opera.

The  is one of the busiest opera houses in the world producing 50 to 60 operas in a repertory system per year and ten ballet productions in more than 350 performances. It is quite common to find a different opera being produced each day of a week. The  employs over 1000 people.

The company's 2019 production of Olga Neuwirth's opera Orlando marked the first production of an opera by a female composer in the history of the Vienna State Opera.

Gustav Mahler

Gustav Mahler was one of the many conductors who have worked in Vienna. During his tenure (1897–1907), Mahler cultivated a new generation of singers, such as Anna Bahr-Mildenburg and Selma Kurz, and recruited a stage designer who replaced the lavish historical stage decors with sparse stage scenery corresponding to modernistic, Jugendstil tastes. Mahler also introduced the practice of dimming the lighting in the theatre during performances, which was initially not appreciated by the audience. However, Mahler's reforms were maintained by his successors.

Herbert von Karajan

Herbert von Karajan introduced the practice of performing operas exclusively in their original language instead of being translated into German. He also strengthened the ensemble and regular principal singers and introduced the policy of predominantly engaging guest singers. He began a collaboration with La Scala in Milan, in which both productions and orchestrations were shared. This created an opening for the prominent members of the Viennese ensemble to appear in Milan, especially to perform works by Wolfgang Amadeus Mozart and Richard Strauss.

Ballet companies merge
At the beginning of the 2005–2006 season, the ballet companies of the Staatsoper and the Vienna Volksoper were merged under the direction of Gyula Harangozó, which led to a reduction in the number of performers in the resulting ensemble. This has resulted in an increase in the number of guest stars engaged to work in the ballet. The practice of combining the two ballet companies proved an artistic failure, and Harangozó left when his contract expired in 2010.

From the 2010–2011 season a new company was formed called Wiener Staatsballet, Vienna State Ballet, under the direction of former Paris Opera Ballet principal dancer Manuel Legris. Legris eliminated Harangozós's policy of presenting nothing but traditional narrative ballets with guest artists in the leading roles, concentrated on establishing a strong in-house ensemble and restored evenings of mixed bill programs, featuring works of George Balanchine, Jerome Robbins, Jiří Kylián, William Forsythe, and many contemporary choreographers, as well as a reduced schedule of the classic ballets.

140th anniversary season
2009 marked the 140th anniversary of the Vienna Opera House. To celebrate this milestone an idea designed to reach out and embrace a new audience was conceived. A giant 50 sqm screen was placed on the side of the opera house facing Kärntner Straße. In four months live broadcasts of over 60 famous operas were transmitted in this way, including performances of Madama Butterfly, The Magic Flute and Don Giovanni. This successful venture brought a new wave of operatic excitement to the many tourists and locals who experienced this cultural event. During daytime the screen displays a replica of the Opera House's façade, as it obstructs a considerable part of the building, along with information about upcoming performances.

The opera house and children 

The Vienna State Opera is particularly open to children: under Holender's direction (he has three children of his own), the opera house has become well known for its children's productions, which are performed in a tent on the roof of the Staatsoper. Recent examples include Peter Pan,  (The Dream Gobbler), Der 35. Mai (The 35th of May), C. F. E. Horneman's Aladdin, Bastien und Bastienne and Wagners Nibelungenring für Kinder (Wagner's Ring for children). In addition to this, there is a production of The Magic Flute every year for 9- and 10-year-olds, decorated like the Opernball.

The opera house also has an opera school for boys and girls between the ages of eight and fourteen, which takes place in the afternoons after regular school. The children are introduced to music theatre and the prospect of becoming opera singers. The company recruits singers for children's roles in its productions from this opera school. Twice every season there is a special matinée performance of the opera school. In 2006, the 250th anniversary of Mozart's birth, they performed a 20-minute miniature opera Der kleine Friedrich arranged from songs of Mozart by Janko Kastelic and Claudia Toman.

"Standing room only" audience 

Eighty minutes before each performance, cheap standing room tickets are sold. These are popular with all age groups, and now have an almost legendary regular clientele, which is merciless in showing its displeasure with a performance loudly and unambiguously, but is even louder in voicing approval.

Der Neue Merker 

Every performance at the Vienna State Opera is reviewed by an independent company in the opera publication Der Neue Merker (The New Judge) which is printed in about 2000 copies. This is unusual in that most opera magazines prefer to concentrate on new productions and premieres. There is an online version parallel to the publication, which receives (as of March 2007) an average of 10,000 visitors a week, and therefore is one of the most successful German-language opera portals.

Opera ball 

For many decades, the opera house has been the venue of the Vienna Opera Ball. It is an internationally renowned event, which takes place annually on the last Thursday in Fasching. Those in attendance often include visitors from around the world, especially prominent names in business and politics. The opera ball receives media coverage from a range of outlets.

The opera ball in 1968 was the occasion for a protest, at which the organisation was criticised for being "elite" (due to the high prices), "conceited" (due to the opulent display of wealth for the newspapers and cameras) and "reactionary" (for upholding an allegedly outdated culture). There was violence between the demonstrators and the police.

Safety curtain 
"Safety Curtain" is an exhibition series conceived by the non-profit art initiative museum in progress, which has been transforming the safety curtain of the Vienna State Opera into a temporary exhibition space for contemporary art since 1998. A jury (Daniel Birnbaum and Hans-Ulrich Obrist) selects the artists whose works are attached to the safety curtain by means of magnets and are shown during the course of a season. Artists up to date: Pierre Alechinsky, Tauba Auerbach, John Baldessari, Matthew Barney, Thomas Bayrle, Tacita Dean, Cerith Wyn Evans, Dominique Gonzalez-Foerster, Richard Hamilton, David Hockney, Christine & Irene Hohenbüchler, Joan Jonas, Martha Jungwirth, Jeff Koons, Maria Lassnig, Oswald Oberhuber, Giulio Paolini, Rirkrit Tiravanija, Rosemarie Trockel, Cy Twombly, Kara Walker, Carrie Mae Weems and Franz West.

Directors/General managers 
In chronological order, the directors (or general managers) of the Staatsoper have been:

 Franz von Dingelstedt (1867–70)
 Johann von Herbeck (1870–75)
 Franz von Jauner (1875–80)
 Wilhelm Jahn (1881–97)
 Gustav Mahler (1897–1907)
 Felix Weingartner, Edler von Münzberg (first term, 1908–11)
 Hans Gregor (1911–18)
 Richard Strauss / Franz Schalk (1919–24)
 Franz Schalk (1924–29)
 Clemens Krauss (1929–34)
 Felix von Weingartner (second term, 1935–36)
  (1936–40)
 Heinrich Karl Strohm (1940–41)
 Lothar Müthel (1941–42)
 Karl Böhm (first term, 1943–45)
 Franz Salmhofer (1945–54)
 Karl Böhm (second term, 1954–56)
 Herbert von Karajan (1956–1964)
 Egon Hilbert (1964–68)
 Heinrich Reif-Gintl (1968–72)
 Rudolf Gamsjäger (1972–76)
 Egon Seefehlner (first term, 1976–82)
 Lorin Maazel (1982–84)
 Egon Seefehlner (second term, 1984–86)
 Claus Helmut Drese (1986–91)
 Eberhard Wächter (1991–92)
 Ioan Holender (1992–2010)
 Dominique Meyer (2010–2020)
 Bogdan Roščić (2020–present)

Artistic/Music Directors
 Richard Strauss (1919–1924)
 Bruno Walter (1936–1938)
 Claudio Abbado (1986–1991)
 Seiji Ozawa (2002–2010)
 Franz Welser-Möst (2010–2014)
 Philippe Jordan (2020–present)

Prominent artists who have appeared at the Staatsoper

Singers

 Theo Adam
 Ain Anger
 Giacomo Aragall
 Agnes Baltsa
 Polly Batic
 Gabriela Beňačková
 Ettore Bastianini
 Piotr Beczała
 Teresa Berganza
 Walter Berry
 Jussi Björling
 Franco Bonisolli
 Montserrat Caballé
 Maria Callas
 José Carreras
 Enrico Caruso
 Mimi Coertse
 Franco Corelli
 José Cura
 Oskar Czerwenka
 Giuseppe Di Stefano
 Plácido Domingo (50th jubilee in May 2017)
 Otto Edelmann
 Anny Felbermayer
 Juan Diego Flórez
 Mirella Freni
 Ferruccio Furlanetto
 Elīna Garanča
 Nicolai Gedda
 Angela Gheorghiu
 Nicolai Ghiaurov
 Tito Gobbi
 Edita Gruberová (40th jubilee in September 2008, 50th jubilee in June 2018)
 Thomas Hampson
 Hans Hotter
 Gundula Janowitz
 Maria Jeritza
 Gwyneth Jones
 Sena Jurinac
 Vesselina Kasarova
 Jonas Kaufmann
 Angelika Kirchschlager
 Alfredo Kraus
 Elisabeth Kulman
 Erich Kunz
 Selma Kurz
 Christa Ludwig (final operatic performance in Elektra, 1994)
 Éva Marton
 Anna Moffo
 Anna Netrebko
 Birgit Nilsson
 Jessye Norman
 Jarmila Novotná
 Hasmik Papian
 Luciano Pavarotti
 Alfred Piccaver
 Lucia Popp
 Hermann Prey
 Leontyne Price
 Gianni Raimondi
 Ruggero Raimondi
 Maria Reining
 Leonie Rysanek
 Matti Salminen
 Elisabeth Schwarzkopf
 Renata Scotto
 Cesare Siepi
 Giulietta Simionato
 Bo Skovhus
 Nina Stemme
 Michail Svetlev
 Giuseppe Taddei
 Martti Talvela
 Richard Tauber
 Renata Tebaldi
 Bryn Terfel
 Rolando Villazón
 Eberhard Wächter
 Otto Wiener
 Fritz Wunderlich
 Heinz Zednik

Conductors

 Claudio Abbado
 Kurt Adler
 Gerd Albrecht
 Ernest Ansermet
 Leonard Bernstein
 Karl Böhm
 Semyon Bychkov
 Riccardo Chailly
 André Cluytens
 Colin Davis
 Victor de Sabata
 Hubert Deutsch
 Antal Doráti
 Christoph von Dohnányi
 Gustavo Dudamel
 Wilhelm Furtwängler
 John Eliot Gardiner
 Daniele Gatti
 Gianandrea Gavazzeni
 Michael Gielen
 Leopold Hager
 Daniel Harding
 Nikolaus Harnoncourt
 Paul Hindemith
 Heinrich Hollreiser`
 Philippe Jordan
 Carlos Kleiber
 Erich Kleiber
 Berislav Klobučar
 Hans Knappertsbusch
 Clemens Krauss
 Josef Krips
 Rafael Kubelík
 Jan Latham-Koenig
 Erich Leinsdorf
 Lorin Maazel
 Charles Mackerras
 Ernst Märzendorfer
 Zubin Mehta
 Dimitri Mitropoulos
 Francesco Molinari-Pradelli
 Pierre Monteux
 Rudolf Moralt
 Lovro von Matačić
 Riccardo Muti
 Andris Nelsons
 Roger Norrington
 Daniel Oren
 Antonio Pappano
 John Pritchard
 Simon Rattle
 Hugo Reichenberger
 Fritz Reiner
 Hans Richter
 Mario Rossi
 Nello Santi
 Michael Schønwandt
 Leif Segerstam
 Tullio Serafin
 Giuseppe Sinopoli
 Leonard Slatkin
 Georg Solti
 Horst Stein
 Pinchas Steinberg
 Igor Stravinsky
 Otmar Suitner
 Robert Stolz
 Richard Strauss
 Christian Thielemann
 Arturo Toscanini
 Silvio Varviso
 Marcello Viotti
 Antonino Votto
 Bruno Walter
 Felix Weingartner
 Alberto Zedda

Directors, set designers, and costume designers
Opera title and year of debut at the Vienna State Opera in parentheses:

 Gae Aulenti (Il viaggio a Reims, 1988)
 Boleslaw Barlog (Salome, 1972)
 Sven-Eric Bechtolf (Arabella, 2006)
 Ruth Berghaus (Fierrabras, 1990)
 Milena Canonero (Il trittico, 1979)
 Robert Carsen (Jérusalem, 1995)
 Giulio Chazalettes (Attila, 1980)
 Luciano Damiani (Don Giovanni, 1967)
 Dieter Dorn (Die Entführung aus dem Serail, 1979)
 August Everding (Tristan und Isolde, 1967)
 Piero Faggioni (Norma, 1977)
 Jürgen Flimm (Der ferne Klang, 1991)
 Götz Friedrich (Moses und Aron, 1973)
 Ezio Frigerio, (Norma, 1977)
 Josef Gielen (Madama Butterfly, 1957)
 Peter J. Hall (Le nozze di Figaro, 1991)
 Karl-Ernst Herrmann (Die Entführung aus dem Serail, 1989)
 Václav Kašlík (Idomeneo, 1971)
 Jorge Lavelli (Der Prozess, 1970)
 Alfred Kirchner (Khovanchina, 1989)
 Harry Kupfer (Die schwarze Maske, 1986)
 Lotfi Mansouri (La fanciulla del west 1978)
 Gian Carlo Menotti (La Cenerentola, 1981)
 Jonathan Miller (Le nozze di Figaro, 1991)
 Giancarlo del Monaco (La forza del destino, 1989)
 Hans Neuenfels (Le Prophète, 1998)
 Hermann Nitsch (Hérodiade, 1995)
 Adrian Noble (Alcina, 2010)
 Timothy O'Brien (Turandot, 1983)
 Tom O'Horgan (Les Troyens, 1976)
 Laurent Pelly (La fille du régiment, 2007)
 Pier Luigi Pizzi (as stage designer: La forza del destino, 1974; as director: Don Carlo, 1989)
 Jean-Pierre Ponnelle (Manon, 1971)
 David Pountney (Rienzi, 1997)
 Harold Prince (Turandot, 1983)
 Gianni Quaranta (Samson et Dalila, 1988)
 Günther Rennert (Il barbiere di Siviglia, 1966)
 Luca Ronconi (Il viaggio a Reims, 1988)
 Ken Russell (Faust, 1985)
 Filippo Sanjust (Ariadne auf Naxos, 1976)
 Johannes Schaaf (Idomeneo, 1987)
 Otto Schenk (Jenůfa, 1964)
 Yuval Sharon (Tri Sestri, 2016)
 Franca Squarciapino (Norma, 1977)
 Peter Stein (Simon Boccanegra, 2002)
 Giorgio Strehler (Simon Boccanegra, 1984)
 Josef Svoboda (Idomeneo, 1971)
 István Szabó (Il trovatore, 1993)
 Carl Toms, (Faust, 1985)
 Luchino Visconti (Falstaff, 1966)
 Antoine Vitez (Pelléas et Mélisande, 1988)
 Wieland Wagner (Lohengrin, 1965)
 Margarete Wallmann (Tosca, 1958)
 Anthony Ward (Alcina, 2010)
 Herbert Wernicke (I vespri siciliani, 1998)
 Peter Wood (Macbeth, 1981)
 Franco Zeffirelli (La bohème, 1964)

See also

 Carltheater
 Ringtheater
 Theater am Kärntnertor

References

External links 

  
(Archives)
 Wiener Staatsoper at Google Cultural Institute

 
Opera houses in Vienna
Josef Hlávka buildings
Ballet venues
Cultural venues in Vienna
Music venues completed in 1869
State Opera
Theatres completed in 1869
1869 establishments in Austria
19th-century architecture in Austria